The NIR 101 Class is a class of diesel-electric locomotive formerly operated by Northern Ireland Railways (NIR).  With the return to the working of the Enterprise service from Belfast to Dublin with coaching stock instead of augmented diesel railcar sets, NIR found itself with no suitable main line diesel locomotives. The Class 101 (DL) became the answer to the immediate problem working in conjunction with the newly acquired British Rail Mark 2 coaches.

History

The 101 Class of NIR consisted of three mainline diesel-electric locomotives designed for use with the Enterprise passenger services between Belfast and Dublin. The intention was to reduce the time for the 180 km (112-mile) journey to two hours. The design of the superstructure and bogies was carried out by the Hunslet Engine Company of Leeds with English Electric-AEI Traction being responsible for the traction equipment. The contract stipulated a ten-month delivery period but with Hunslet's workshops already committed, the superstructure and assembly was contracted out to (British Rail Engineering Limited's, Doncaster Works), Hunslet providing the bogies. They were of Bo-Bo wheel arrangement and fitted with CSVT Mk. II  engines. The locomotives were fitted with buckeye couplers as standard and had air brake capability for operation with the Mark 2 coaches.

They were visually, mechanically & electrically very similar to the  KTMB class 22 (Keretapi Tanah Melayu Berhad - Malaysian Railways) locomotives built by English Electric at around the same time, however these had had a Co-Co arrangement and an uprated power unit. A small number are still operated.

The press launch of the new Enterprise was held on 3 July 1970 when a special train, carrying invited guests, ran from Great Victoria Street, Belfast to Dublin with two locomotives working the train, one at each end. This was generally well received, however comments were made regarding the train "hunting" due to the second locomotive pushing from the rear.

All three re-use names previously used by the Great Northern Railway Class V locomotives, as follows:

Replacement
Towards the end of the 1970s, although only 10 years old, the class were suffering from regular failures in service and they were displaced from the principal passenger workings by the arrival of the NIR 111 Class locomotives. The 101s were cascaded to lesser duties, such as shunting in Adelaide Yard.

All three locomotives progressively withdrawn from service, the first having been stored in 1989 (103) and the last in 1999 (102). After two years out of service, 102 was briefly re-instated as a working locomotive in 2001. This was short-lived as the locomotive was stopped after only one trip, and placed back into storage at Whitehead, County Antrim.

Number 103 was scrapped in 1997. Numbers 101 and 102, however, remained at Whitehead for some time until offered by Translink for sale.

Preservation

Translink offered the two inoperable locomotives 101 and 102 for sale after withdrawal. The Railway Preservation Society of Ireland (RPSI) bid for the locomotives, and succeeded in purchasing them. Since both were already located at the RPSI's Whitehead site, they did not need to be moved. As it was, neither locomotive would be able to operate until they received a full overhaul to working condition, as the engines had been stopped in the late 1980s-early 1990s and by this time would require remedial work before they could be fired up.

In 2005, number 102 was selected for restoration to working order, while 101 was chosen to be cannibalised for spare parts to restore 102. However, the attempt to restore 102 did not occur because of a series of external issues, and so the locomotive was left in storage in the Whitehead sidings. All openings such as the exhaust outlet were covered over to prevent rainwater ingress from damaging the cylinder heads, but other than covering these openings, no further work was taken. It was hoped in 2008 to move it to the Downpatrick and County Down Railway for restoration, but this too did not come to fruition.

In 2009, a second attempt was made to restore 102 to working order, starting with a brief attempt to get the engine in 102 to turn over. The plan was eventually mothballed, but not before the following was achieved:
 The locomotive's batteries were either recharged or replaced (as some were now missing).
 The isolating switch, which had burnt out in 2005, was replaced with that from 101.
 The air filters were replaced with the cleaner ones from 101.
 The oil return valve was cleaned out and adjusted.
 A faulty relay was cleaned to allow the Start Control Contactor to close, allowing the engine to be 'turned over'.
 Using a 110 V battery charger, the batteries were charged enough to turn the engine briskly.
 A temporary fuel supply was set up using a 5-gallon tank of diesel as the fuel in 102's tank had deteriorated due to six years of storage.

The locomotive was successfully fired up for a minute using this temporary fuel supply with two of the eight cylinders firing (only six were considered operational as two cylinders had stuck exhaust valves). This however ended when the vibrations of the engine jarred the temporary external fuel feed out of the temporary fuel tank, starving the engine of fuel and causing it to shut down prematurely. The decision was already made by then to mothball the project, and so the locomotive was returned to long-term storage.

As of 2010, the RPSI website reported that 102 had its leaky roof patched with tarpaulins, and that there were no plans to restart it in the near future. It requires a full overhaul, supposedly much of which relates to the locomotive's body, engine, and other associated components. No further work was done to the locomotive until it was sold in late 2011 to the Ulster Folk & Transport Museum.

In January 2012, 102 was transported with fellow UFTM resident CIE 113 Class B113 from Whitehead to Cultra under the cover of night. Although 102 was able to operate, albeit in a limited capacity due to the extent of engine repairs required, neither was mechanically fit enough to make the trip under their own power. The two locomotives were instead hauled by NIR 111 class locomotives 112 Northern Counties and 8113 (113) Belfast & County Down. Prior to the move, 102 was repainted in its original red with yellow stripe livery.

Locomotive 101 remained in storage at Whitehead, Co. Antrim, ostensibly as a source of spare parts for 102. Due to pressure for space as a result of the arrival of B(141) class locomotive B142 from Inchicore, attempts were made to seek a buyer for 101. This did not materialise, and it was decided to reluctantly scrap the partially stripped 101 and remove any useful parts for use on 102. The remains of the locomotive were cut up in January 2010.

Livery
When delivered the locomotives were painted in an unlined maroon livery with, on the ends, a "flowing V" in a golden yellow colour. The "NIR" logo and numbers were transfers. From 1978 the livery was changed to blue with an orange/red shallow 'V' stripe on each end ( See photograph above). The first locomotive in the new livery appeared on 3 July. 102 later carried a slightly darker shade of blue with black cab surrounds and yellow end panels.

References

External links 

 Eiretrains - Irish Locomotives
 Railway Preservation Society of Ireland webpage for preserved 101 Class No.101
 Railway Preservation Society of Ireland webpage for preserved 101 Class No.102

Diesel-electric locomotives of Northern Ireland
Diesel-electric locomotives of Ireland
5 ft 3 in gauge locomotives
Hunslet locomotives
Bo-Bo locomotives
Railway locomotives introduced in 1970
English Electric locomotives